Henry Digby may refer to:

 Henry Digby, 1st Earl Digby (1731–1793)
 Sir Henry Digby (Royal Navy officer) (1770–1842), British naval officer, served in the French Revolutionary and Napoleonic Wars
 Henry Digby, 13th Baron Digby  (born 1954), the current Baron Digby

See also
 Henry Digby Beste (1768–1836), Catholic aristocrat